Igor Khokhryakov (born 25 January 1965) is a Belarusian biathlete. He competed in the men's sprint event at the 1994 Winter Olympics.

References

External links
 

1965 births
Living people
Belarusian male biathletes
Olympic biathletes of Belarus
Biathletes at the 1994 Winter Olympics
People from Chusovoy